Michael J. Carberry is a former Democratic member of the Illinois House of Representatives, representing the 36th District from March 2010, when he was appointed to replace retiring James D. Brosnahan, until January 2011. The 36th District includes all or parts of Oak Lawn, Evergreen Park, Chicago Ridge, Hometown, Palos Hills and Chicago's 18th, 19th, and 21st Wards.

Carberry helped found CECO Inc., a contractor for the International Brotherhood of Electrical Workers Local 134.

Carberry and his wife, Michelle have three children: Mary Kate, Claire and Sean. A lifelong resident of the area, Carberry attended St. Catherine of Alexandria grade school and Brother Rice High School.  He received his B.A. in journalism from Western Kentucky University and also attended Northeast Louisiana University, now known as the University of Louisiana-Monroe.

External links
Illinois General Assembly - Representative Michael J. Carberry (D) 36th District official IL House website
Bills Committees
Project Vote Smart - Representative Michael J. Carberry (IL) profile
Illinois House Democrats - Michael J. Carberry profile

Living people
Members of the Illinois House of Representatives
Western Kentucky University alumni
Year of birth missing (living people)